Bernard Gerrard Whiteside MBE (born 3 October 1954) is a retired British diplomat who was Ambassador to Moldova and Ecuador.

Career
1983–1986 Moscow (Third Secretary, Commercial) 
1986–1989 Geneva: UK Delegation to the Conference on Disarmament (Third (later Second) Secretary)
1989–1990 FCO Press Officer 
1991–1995 Bogota (Second Secretary Aid/Chancery) 
1996          Brussels: UK Representation to the EU (First Secretary, Justice & Home Affairs) 
1997–1999 Head of Policy Section, Migration & Visa Department 
1999–2001 Seconded to Department for International Development:Russia (Programme Manager)  
2002–2006 Ambassador to Moldova
2007–2008 Ambassador to Ecuador

References
WHITESIDE, Bernard Gerrard, Who's Who 2013, A & C Black, 2013; online edn, Oxford University Press, Dec 2012, accessed 9 April 2013 

1954 births
Living people
Alumni of Westfield College
Ambassadors of the United Kingdom to Ecuador
Ambassadors of the United Kingdom to Moldova
Members of the Order of the British Empire